Tentax argentescens is a moth of the family Erebidae first described by George Hampson in 1912. It is found in Sri Lanka.

The wingspan is 10–13 mm. The forewings are light brown, with dark-brown subterminal and terminal areas, including the fringes. There is a blackish-grey quadrangular patch in the upper area, with a prominent black dot at the inner, lower patch. The costa is basally black, subapically with small black dots. The crosslines are weakly defined. The subterminal line is light brown and the terminal line is indicated by black interveinal dots. The hindwings are grey with a discal spot. The underside of the forewings is unicolorous grey brown and the underside of the hindwings is grey with a discal spot.

References

Micronoctuini
Moths described in 1912